Davide Cesarini (born 16 February 1995) is a Sammarinese footballer who plays for S.P. Tre Penne.

External links 
 

1995 births
Living people
Campionato Sammarinese di Calcio players
Sammarinese footballers
San Marino international footballers
Association football defenders